Amer Hakeem  is a Singaporean professional footballer currently playing as a defender for Singapore Premier League side Balestier Khalsa FC.

He is the second son of Nazri Nasir and Sharifah Almaghbouly, former Singapore national football team player.

Career statistics 
10 Oct 2021

International Statistics

U16 International caps

U16 goals
Scores and results list Singapore's goal tally first.

References

1997 births
Living people
Singaporean footballers
Association football midfielders
Singapore Premier League players
Young Lions FC players